Killyran (either  or ) is a townland in the civil parish of Templeport, County Cavan, Ireland. It lies in the Roman Catholic parish of Templeport and barony of Tullyhaw.

Geography

Killyran is bounded on the north by Boley and Gortaclogher townlands, on the west by Glebe and Drumreilly townlands in County Leitrim, on the south by Kilnacreevy townland in County Leitrim and on the east by Ballymagauran and Killywillin townlands. Its chief geographical features are Glebe Lough, Killyran Big Lough, Killyran Little Lough, the River Blackwater, County Cavan, a stream, spring wells and dug wells. Killywillin is traversed by minor roads, rural lanes and the disused Cavan and Leitrim Railway. The townland covers 330 statute acres.

History

Up until the 18th century Killyran formed part of the modern townland of Ballymagauran  and its history is the same until then.

A deed by Arthur Ellis dated 19 Mar 1768 includes the lands of Killyron.

A deed by Gore Ellis dated 24 Feb 1776 includes the lands of Killyran.

The 1790 Cavan Carvaghs list spells the name as Kilran.

In the 1825 Registry of Freeholders for County Cavan there was one freeholder registered with a freehold in Killeran, although he lived in Ballymagauran- John Brooke. He was a Forty-shilling freeholders holding a lease for lives from his landlord, Lord John Beresford, the Archbishop of Armagh (Church of Ireland).

The Tithe Applotment Books for 1827 list thirteen tithepayers in the townland.

The Killyran Valuation Office Field books are available for 1839-1840.

Griffith's Valuation of 1857 lists twenty four landholders in the townland.

In the Dúchas Folklore Collection is a description of Killyran in 1938 by Edna Gerty.

A book about life in Killyran from 1929 to 1947, Water under the Railway Bridge by Bill Gerty, is viewable online.

Killyran National school was actually located in the townland of Boley, Templeport, not in Killyran.

Census

In the 1901 census of Ireland, there are eighteen families listed in the townland, and in the 1911 census of Ireland, there are only seventeen families listed in the townland.

Antiquities

The chief structures of historical interest in the townland are:
 Killyran Bridge
 Killyran  Railway Station on  the disused Cavan and Leitrim Railway.

References

External links
The IreAtlas Townland Data Base

Townlands of County Cavan